Hurbanovo (until 1948 Stará Ďala) is a town and large municipality in the Komárno District in the Nitra Region of south-west Slovakia. In 1948, its Slovak name was changed to Hurbanovo, named after Slovak writer Jozef Miloslav Hurban.

History 
In historical records the town was first mentioned in 1329.

Geography 
The town lies at an elevation of 115 metres and covers an area of 59.943 km2.
Hurbanovo is situated on the climatically warmest location of the Podunajská nížina lowland, and it is located on the left bank of the Žitava river in the area with an altitude around 115 metres above the sea level.

Demographics 
According to the 2021 census, the municipality had 7,467 inhabitants. 3,780 (or 50,62 %) of inhabitants were Slovaks, 3,038 (or 40,69 %) Hungarians, 179 (2,4 %) Roma, 28 (0,37 %) Czechs, 468 others and unspecified.

Government 
The town has a birth registry, a police force and a tax office.

Facilities 
The town has a public library, a DVD rental store and a cinema. It also has a football pitch. The town has a commercial bank and insurance company and number of general and food stores. It has a doctor's surgery and an outpatient facility for children and adolescents and a gynaecologist.
A brewery, called Zlatý Bažant, also operates in the town.

Transport 
The town has a garage and petrol station and a railway station.

Famous people 
 Gabriela Dudeková, historian
 Árpád Feszty, artist, painter
 Miklós Konkoly-Thege, astronomer

Climate
Climate in this area has mild differences between highs and lows, and there is adequate rainfall year-round. The Köppen Climate Classification subtype for this climate is "Cfb". (Marine West Coast Climate).

Twin towns — sister cities

Hurbanovo is twinned with:
 Lovran, Croatia
 Pápa, Hungary
 Žlutice, Czech Republic

Gallery

See also
List of municipalities and towns in Slovakia

References

Genealogical resources
The records for genealogical research are available at the state archive "Státný archiv in Nitra, Slovakia"

 Roman Catholic church records (births/marriages/deaths): 1764-1918 (parish A)
 Reformated church records (births/marriages/deaths): 1793-1942 (parish A)

External links

Surnames of living people in Hurbanovo

Cities and towns in Slovakia
Hungarian communities in Slovakia
Villages and municipalities in the Komárno District